Bogdany refers to the following places in Poland:

 Bogdany, Braniewo County
 Bogdany, Olsztyn County

See also
 Bogdani, a surname